Essex West was a federal electoral district in the province of Ontario, Canada, that was  represented in the House of Commons of Canada from 1925 to 1968. This riding was created in 1924 from parts of Essex North riding.

It was initially defined to consist of the city of Windsor, the town of Sandwich and the townships of East and West Sandwich in the county of Essex, including the towns of Ford City and Walkerville, or the villages of Riverside, Tecumseh and St. Clair Shores.

In 1933, it was redefined to consist of the township of Sandwich West in the county of Essex including the town of Sandwich and the part of the city of Windsor lying north of Tecumseh Road.

In 1947, it was redefined to exclude the part city of Windsor city lying south of Tecumseh Boulevard and east of the line dividing lots facing on Lincoln Road to the east and Gladstone Avenue to the west.

The electoral district was abolished in 1966 when it was redistributed between Essex, Windsor West and Windsor—Walkerville ridings.

Members of Parliament

This riding elected the following members of the House of Commons of Canada:

Election results

|}

|}

|}

|}

|}

|}

|}

|}

|}

|}

 
|Co-operative Builders
|Edgar-Bernard Charron       
|align="right"| 261
|}

|}

|}

See also 

 List of Canadian federal electoral districts
 Past Canadian electoral districts

External links 

 Website of the Parliament of Canada

Former federal electoral districts of Ontario